Cossidophaga is a genus of bristle flies in the family Tachinidae.

Species
Cossidophaga atkinsoni (Aubertin, 1932)

Distribution
Myanmar.

References

Exoristinae
Tachinidae genera
Endemic fauna of Myanmar
Diptera of Asia
Monotypic Brachycera genera
Taxa named by Nikolay Ilyich Baranov